In Greek mythology, Calyce (Ancient Greek: Καλύκη Kalyke) or Calycia is the name of several characters.

Calyce, one of the Nysiads, the nymphs who nursed Dionysus.
Calyce, a Thessalian princess as the daughter of King Aeolus of Aeolia and Enarete, daughter of Deimachus. She was the sister of Athamas, Cretheus, Deioneus, Magnes, Perieres, Salmoneus, Sisyphus, Alcyone, Canace, Perimede and Peisidice.  Some sources stated that Calyce was the mother of Endymion, king of Elis, by her husband Aethlius, former king of Elis or by Zeus. Other sources made her the mother, not the wife, of Aethlius (again by Zeus), and omitted her giving birth to Endymion.
Calyce, mother of Poseidon's son Cycnus. She was given as the daughter of Hecaton. Cycnus was born in secret, and left to die on the coast, but went on to become a king. In some accounts, the mother of Cycnus was called Harpale or Scamandrodice or lastly, an unnamed Nereid.
Calyce, a chaste maiden who was in love with one Euathlus and prayed to Aphrodite that she may become his wife rather than mistress. Nevertheless, Euathlus rejected her and she threw herself off a cliff.
Calyce, a maenad named in a vase painting.

Modern references
The lunar crater Kalyke is named after the first Kalyke, as is a moon of Jupiter.

Notes

References 

 Apollodorus, The Library with an English Translation by Sir James George Frazer, F.B.A., F.R.S. in 2 Volumes, Cambridge, MA, Harvard University Press; London, William Heinemann Ltd. 1921. Online version at the Perseus Digital Library. Greek text available from the same website.
Athenaeus of Naucratis. The Deipnosophists or Banquet of the Learned. London. Henry G. Bohn, York Street, Covent Garden. 1854.  Online version at the Perseus Digital Library.
 Athenaeus of Naucratis. Deipnosophistae. Kaibel. In Aedibus B.G. Teubneri. Lipsiae. 1887. Greek text available at the Perseus Digital Library.
Gaius Julius Hyginus, Fabulae from The Myths of Hyginus translated and edited by Mary Grant. University of Kansas Publications in Humanistic Studies. Online version at the Topos Text Project.
 Hesiod, Catalogue of Women from Homeric Hymns, Epic Cycle, Homerica translated by Evelyn-White, H G. Loeb Classical Library Volume 57. London: William Heinemann, 1914. Online version at theio.com 
 Nonnus of Panopolis, Dionysiaca translated by William Henry Denham Rouse (1863-1950), from the Loeb Classical Library, Cambridge, MA, Harvard University Press, 1940.  Online version at the Topos Text Project.
 Nonnus of Panopolis, Dionysiaca. 3 Vols. W.H.D. Rouse. Cambridge, MA., Harvard University Press; London, William Heinemann, Ltd. 1940-1942. Greek text available at the Perseus Digital Library.
 Pausanias, Description of Greece with an English Translation by W.H.S. Jones, Litt.D., and H.A. Ormerod, M.A., in 4 Volumes. Cambridge, MA, Harvard University Press; London, William Heinemann Ltd. 1918. Online version at the Perseus Digital Library
 Pausanias, Graeciae Descriptio. 3 vols. Leipzig, Teubner. 1903.  Greek text available at the Perseus Digital Library.

Nymphs
Companions of Dionysus
Maenads
Aeolides
Princesses in Greek mythology
Queens in Greek mythology
Women of Poseidon
Thessalian characters in Greek mythology
Thessalian mythology